Mirrabooka Avenue is a major north-south road located in the northern suburbs of Perth, Western Australia. It is a four-lane dual carriageway for its entire length. It mainly passes through residential areas, as well as industrial areas on the northern end of the road in Landsdale. On the southern end, it is continuous with Nollamara Avenue. On the northern end, it is continuous with Gnangara Road, which meets up with Ocean Reef Road and state route 84.

History
In 2010, construction started on a diamond interchange for the junction of Reid Highway and Mirrabooka Avenue to improve safety and efficiency. Between 1999 and 2009, there were 400 crashes at the intersection, resulting in 4 fatalities and 38 serious injuries. In 2011, the work was completed.

In 2011, Mirrabooka Avenue was extended north from Hepburn Avenue to Gnangara Road.

In March 2018, construction started on duplicating the last remaining section of single carriageway road, from Hepburn Avenue to Gnangara Road, which was completed in October 2018.

Junction list

See also

References

Roads in Perth, Western Australia